The 12th World Science Fiction Convention (Worldcon), also known as SFCon, was held on 3–6 September 1954 at the Sir Francis Drake Hotel in San Francisco, California, United States.

The chairmen were Lester Cole and Gary Nelson.

Participants 

Attendance was approximately 700.

Guests of Honor 

 John W. Campbell, Jr.

Awards

1954 Retro Hugo Awards 

The previous Worldcon (the 11th) was the first one in which Hugo Awards were awarded. The 12th Worldcon did not continue the tradition, but since the next one (the 13th), Hugo Awards have been a permanent fixture of the conventions.

However, in 2004 at the 62nd World Science Fiction Convention held in Boston, a set of Retro Hugo Awards were presented to honor work that would have been Hugo-eligible had the awards been awarded in 1954:

 Best Novel: Fahrenheit 451, by Ray Bradbury
 Best Novella: "A Case of Conscience," by James Blish
 Best Novelette: "Earthman, Come Home," by James Blish
 Best Short Story: "The Nine Billion Names of God," by Arthur C. Clarke
 Best Related Book: Conquest of the Moon, by Wernher von Braun, Fred L. Whipple & Willy Ley
 Best Professional Editor: John W. Campbell, Jr.
 Best Professional Artist: Chesley Bonestell
 Best Dramatic Presentation: The War of the Worlds
 Best Fanzine: Slant, Walt Willis, editor; James White, art editor
 Best Fan Writer: Bob Tucker

See also 

 Hugo Award
 Science fiction
 Speculative fiction
 World Science Fiction Society
 Worldcon

References 

1954 conferences
1954 in California
Science fiction conventions in the United States
Worldcon